The O'Chiese First Nation is a Saulteaux First Nation in Alberta, Canada. The First Nation's homeland is the  O'Chiese 203 Indian reserve, located approximately 52 km northwest of Rocky Mountain House. Also reserved is the O'Chiese Cemetery 203A. As of November 2013, the First Nation had the population of 1,250 registered people, of which the on-reserve population was 831 people. The primary language spoken on the reserve is Western Ojibwa. Though the ancestors of O'Chiese First Nation made the area about the Baptiste River their winter camp site where they hunted moose and deer, and trapped small game for the fur trade, they also migrated in the summer as far south as the Milk River in what is now Montana.

Governance 
The O'Chiese First Nation elect their leadership through the Act Electoral System. The First Nation is affiliated with Yellowhead Tribal Council. O'Chiese First Nation is a signatory to Treaty 6 adhesion, signed on May 13, 1950.

See also 
 Aboriginal peoples in Alberta

References

External links 
 

First Nations governments in Alberta
Anishinaabe reserves in Canada
Saulteaux